The Weston family is a prominent Canadian-origin family of businesspeople with global interests primarily in food and clothing ventures. The family operations began with the purchase of a bakery in 1884 by American-born Canadian George Weston in Toronto, Ontario. Since then, his family members have also branched to Ireland and the United Kingdom.

Through George Weston Limited and various holding companies, the Canadian branch of the Weston family currently owns or controls over 200 companies, including the Loblaws supermarket chain and the Shoppers Drug Mart pharmacy chain. Among their other businesses, members of this branch own or control several additional retailers, including Holt Renfrew in Canada. They previously owned other upscale department stores in the Selfridges Group, including Selfridges in the UK, Brown Thomas and Arnotts in Ireland, and De Bijenkorf in the Netherlands.

The main holding company of the British branch of the family is Wittington Investments. 79.2% of this company belongs to a British charitable trust called the Garfield Weston Foundation, with the balance owned by various family members. Wittington Investments owns a majority stake in Associated British Foods (which itself owns the discount clothing chain Primark), and 100% of British retailers Fortnum & Mason and Heal's.

In 2021, The Sunday Times named the Weston family among the most charitable people for the last 20 years, with donations of £1.661 billion.

Wealth
In 2018, the Westons were named Ireland's richest family for the tenth year running, with a wealth of €11.42 billion.

In the Sunday Times Rich List 2020 ranking of the wealthiest people in the UK, "Guy Weston, Galen Weston Jr., George G. Weston and family" were placed 8th with an estimated family fortune of £10.53 billion.

Family members

George Weston (1864–1924), married Emma Maud Richards; six children (of whom two sons and two daughters survived childhood), including:
W. Garfield Weston (1898–1978), married Reta Lila Howard (1897–1967); nine children:
Miriam Louise Weston (1922–2008), married Charles Ryland Burnett Jr. (1918–2004); one child:
Charles Ryland Burnett III (1956–2018)
George Grainger Weston (born 1923), married the Hon. Caroline Cecily Douglas-Scott-Montagu (1925–2017), daughter of John Douglas-Scott-Montagu, 2nd Baron Montagu of Beaulieu; five children
Graham Weston
Gregg Weston
Galvin Weston
Sarah Weston
Barbara Elizabeth Weston (died 2001), married Dr. Robert Ian Mitchell (d. 2002); six children:
Garfield Mitchell
Eliza Mitchell
Mark W. Mitchell
Emma Susan Mitchell, married Charles Adamo
Sarah Mitchell, married Eric Siebert 
Serena Mitchell mother of 1 child
Garry Weston (1927–2002), married Mary Kippenberger, daughter of Major General Sir Howard Kippenberger; six children:
Sir Guy Weston (born 1960)
Jana Khayat (born 1961)
Kate Hobhouse
George G. Weston  (born 1964)
Sophia Mason
Garth Weston
Nancy Weston, married Stanley Baron
Wendy Weston, married Leslie Rebanks
Gretchen Weston, married Humberto Bauta
Camilla Weston, married Peter Dalglish; three children:
Kim Dalglish, married Martin Abell
Geordie Dalglish, married Swith Bell
Genevieve Kate Dalglish (1970–2017)
Galen Weston (1940–2021), married Hilary Frayne (born 1942); two children:
Alannah Weston (born 1972), married Alexander Cochrane, elder son of Sir Marc Cochrane, 4th Baronet
Galen Weston Jr. (born 1972), married Alexandra Schmidt, granddaughter of Thomas J. Bata
Walter Weston (1861-1953), brother of George was involved in bakery but left with family to settle in Saskatchewan where he died in 1953.
Caleb Weston

See also
 Garfield Weston Foundation (based in the United Kingdom)
 Weston Family Foundation (based in Canada)

References

https://www.legacy.com/obituaries/theglobeandmail/obituary.aspx?n=barbara-elizabeth-mitchell-weston&pid=189718955&fhid=9911
https://www.legacy.com/obituaries/theglobeandmail/obituary.aspx?n=robert-mitchell&pid=189763548&fhid=9911

 
Canadian businesspeople
Canadian business families
British families